The 1961 NCAA University Division basketball tournament involved 24 schools playing in single-elimination play to determine the national champion of men's NCAA Division I college basketball in the United States. It began on March 14, 1961, and ended with the championship game on March 25 in Kansas City, Missouri. A total of 28 games were played, including a third place game in each region and a national third place game.

Cincinnati, coached by Ed Jucker, won the national title with a 70–65 victory in the final game over state rival Ohio State, coached by Fred Taylor. Jerry Lucas of Ohio State was named the tournament's Most Outstanding Player.

As of the regional finals of the 2019 tournament, no NCAA Division I tournament games since then have gone to a fourth overtime period. Saint Joseph's victory was later vacated because of the 1961 gambling scandal.

Locations

The Final Four would return to the Municipal Auditorium in Kansas City for the record eighth time. Only one on-campus venue, Allen Fieldhouse, was used, along with two off-campus sites in Louisville and Houston. This would be the last tournament until 1986 where the majority of venues were not regular hosts of college teams. There were two new venues used in the 1961 tournament. For the first time, the tournament came to the city of Houston, with games played at Delmar Fieldhouse, then the home for the Houston Cougars. This would be the first of five venues in the city to host games. The West Regional and two quarterfinal games were held at the brand new Memorial Coliseum in Portland, the second time the city had hosted games. The Memorial Coliseum was one of two venues, along with Freedom Hall, to host three rounds of the tournament in 1961. This would be the only year to feature Delmar Fieldhouse, and the last of sixteen seasons in nineteen years that the old Madison Square Garden in New York City would host games. The city would return to the tournament in nine years, when Alumni Hall on the St. John's campus hosted first-round games. However, it would take until 2014 for the tournament to return to the third MSG's successor.

Teams

Bracket
* – Denotes overtime period

East region

Mideast region

Midwest region

West region

Final Four

National Third Place Game

Regional third place games

See also
 1961 NCAA College Division basketball tournament
 1961 National Invitation Tournament
 1961 NAIA Division I men's basketball tournament

References

NCAA Division I men's basketball tournament
Ncaa
NCAA University Division basketball tournament
NCAA University Division basketball tournament
Sports in Portland, Oregon
Basketball in Houston